Le Born is a commune in the Lozère department in southern France.

Geography
The Colagne and the lac de Charpal form part of the commune's northern border.

Population

Sights
 Arboretum de Born

See also
 Communes of the Lozère department

References

Communes of Lozère